The Cryptic era is an informal term for the earliest geologic evolution of the Earth and Moon. It is the oldest (informal) era of the Hadean eon, and it is commonly accepted to have begun close to 4533 million (about 4.533 billion) years ago when the Earth and Moon formed, and lasted to about 4.15 billion years ago. No samples exist to date the transition between the Cryptic era and the following Basin Groups era for the Moon (see also Pre-Nectarian), though sometimes it is stated that this era ended 4150 million years ago for one or both of these bodies. Neither this time period, nor any other Hadean subdivision, has been officially recognized by the International Commission on Stratigraphy.

This time is cryptic because very little geological evidence has survived from this time. Most geological landforms and rocks were probably destroyed in the early bombardment phase, or by the continued effects of plate tectonics. The Earth accreted, its interior differentiated and its molten surface solidified during the Cryptic era. The proposed collision that led to the formation of the Moon occurred also at this time. The oldest known minerals are from the Cryptic era.

See also

Geological time scale (Earth)
Lunar geologic time scale

References

External links
"Cryptic" Geowhen Database

01
Geologic time scales of Earth
Lunar geologic periods